A lifestyle business (also referred to as a lifestyle venture) is a business set up and run by its founders primarily with the aim of living or maintaining a certain lifestyle. It's meant to be a business which adjusts to the lifestyle - so that the founder can live their life as they like (and oftentimes already do).

Some types of enterprise are more accessible than others to the would-be lifestyle business person. Those requiring extensive capital (for example: car manufacturing) are difficult to launch and sustain on a lifestyle basis; others such as small creative industries businesses are more practical for sole practitioners or small groups such as husband-and-wife teams.

Lifestyle businesses typically have limited scalability and potential for growth because such growth would destroy the lifestyle for which their owner-managers set them up. However, lifestyle businesses can and do win awards and provide satisfaction to their owners and customers. If sufficient high-quality creative producers begin to naturally cluster together, such as in Brighton, England, during the 1990s, the perception of a place can be radically changed (see Porter's cluster).

Cultural context

The term is used in both favorable and derogatory meaning.  An example of individuals who promote the concept of lifestyle businesses favorably include Tim Ferriss's The 4-Hour Workweek and other numerous blogs that emphasize the concept of passive income with the same goal of lifestyle businesses.  These individuals create an image of lifestyle businesses and passive income that promotes an easy lifestyle and something that individuals should aspire towards. In the derogatory sense, a business started with the intention of becoming a startup, but which instead becomes a smaller business is often referred to as a lifestyle business by investors or other detractors.

Notes

References
 Henricks, Mark. Not just a living (2002), p. xvii.
 Phillips, W. Glasgow. The Royal Nonesuch (2007), p. 85.
 Schreiber, Don. Building a World-Class Financial Services Business (2001), p. 46.
 Thyne, Maree; Eric Laws. Hospitality, Tourism, and Lifestyle Concepts (2005), p. 12.

See also
Lifestyle guru
Lifestyle brand

External links 
 The Lifestyle Business Bullshit

Lifestyle